'Una grande famiglia (English: The family) is an Italian television TV series produced for Rai 1, the flagship television channel of RAI, Italy's national public service broadcaster, and the most watched television channel in the country. It is one of the most successful series in Italy. The series has also been translated into French, German and Polish.

See also
 List of Italian television series

Pictures

External links
 

Italian television series
RAI original programming